The Nebraska Department of Education is the U.S. State of Nebraska's state education agency responsible for administering public education funding from the U.S. Department of Education and the Nebraska State Legislature. It is headquartered in Lincoln.
Nebraska is one of three states that opted to continue to buy ground meat containing finely textured beef as an additive for its school lunches in 2012.

See also 
 Omaha Public Schools
 Lincoln Public Schools
 Grand Island Public Schools
Nebraska Center for the Education of Children Who Are Blind or Visually Impaired

References

External links
 Nebraska Department of Education

Public education in Nebraska
State agencies of Nebraska
State departments of education of the United States
School accreditors